Events in the year 1882 in music.

Specific locations
1882 in Norwegian music

Events
January – Richard Wagner completes his opera Parsifal
July 26 – Wagner's Parsifal is premièred at the Bayreuth Festspielhaus under the baton of Hermann Levi with the tenor Hermann Winkelmann in the title rôle and Engelbert Humperdinck assisting in the production
August 8–20 – Tchaikovsky's 1812 Overture is premièred in a tent near the (at this time) unfinished Cathedral of Christ the Saviour in Moscow under the baton of Ippolit Al'tani 
Gustav Mahler is employed at Olomouc
Richard Strauss enters Munich University

Published popular music
 "Baa! Baa! Baa!" (w. Walter Greenaway m. Vincent Davies)
 "The Band Quartette" by Charles A. White
 "Bow, Bow, Ye Lower Middle Classes" (w. W. S. Gilbert m. Arthur Sullivan)
 "Goodbye, My Lover, Goodbye" (trad Eng)
 "In My Fust 'Usband's Time" (w.m. Harry Nicholls)
 "The Old Miser" by Charles A. White
 Les Patineurs (waltz) ("The Skaters' Waltz") (m. Emile Waldteufel)
 "Sweet Violets" by Joseph Emmet
 "Up Went The Price" (w.m. George Ware)
From the score of Iolanthe:
"I'm Very Much Pained" (w. W. S. Gilbert m. Arthur Sullivan)
"Loudly Let The Trumpets Bray" (w. W. S. Gilbert m. Arthur Sullivan)
"The Nightmare Song" (w. W. S. Gilbert m. Arthur Sullivan)
"None Shall Part Us" (w. W. S. Gilbert m. Arthur Sullivan)
"Oh, Foolish Fay" (w. W. S. Gilbert m. Arthur Sullivan)
"Tho' P'raps I May Incur Your Blame" (w. W. S. Gilbert m. Arthur Sullivan)
"Though The Views Of The House Have Diverged" (w. W. S. Gilbert m. Arthur Sullivan)
"Tripping Hither, Tripping Thither" (w. W. S. Gilbert m. Arthur Sullivan)
"Welcome To Our Hearts Again" (w. W. S. Gilbert m. Arthur Sullivan)
"When All Night Long A Chap Remains" (w. W. S. Gilbert m. Arthur Sullivan)
"When Britain Really Ruled The Waves" (w. W. S. Gilbert m. Arthur Sullivan)
"When I Went To The Bar" (w. W. S. Gilbert m. Arthur Sullivan)

Classical music
Alexander Glazunov – String Quartet No. 1
Charles Gounod – The Redemption (oratorio)
Hans Huber – Symphony no. 1 "Wilhelm Tell"
Mikhail Ippolitov-Ivanov – Yar-khmel (Spring Overture)
Camille Saint-Saëns – Deux chœurs, for mixed chorus with piano ad libitum
Pablo de Sarasate – Spanish Dances for violin and piano, Book IV
Bedřich Smetana – String Quartet no. 2
Johann Strauss – Voices of Spring
Sergey Tanyenev – Overture on a Russian Theme

Opera
Friedrich Lux – Der Schmied von Ruhla, Stadtheater, Mainz, 28 March
Adolf Neuendorff – Don Quixote
Nikolai Rimsky-Korsakov – The Snow Maiden, Mariinsky Theatre, Saint Petersburg, 29 January 1882 (OS; 10 February NS)
Camille Saint-Saëns – Henry VIII
Richard Wagner – Parsifal, Bayreuth Festspielhaus, 26 July

Musical theater
 Der Bettelstudent (The Beggar Student), Vienna production
 The Grand Mogul, Broadway production
Iolanthe (Music: Sir Arthur Sullivan Book and Lyrics: W. S. Gilbert); London production opened at the Savoy Theatre on November 25 and ran for 398 performances
Iolanthe, Broadway production opened at the Standard Theatre on December 1
 The Queen's Lace Handkerchief, Broadway production opened at the Casino Theatre on October 21 and ran for 571 performances
The Smugglers (musical), Broadway production

Births
January 15 – Henry Burr, popular tenor, prolific early recording artist (d. 1941)
February 11
Gheorghe Cucu composer (d. 1932)
Joe Jordan, musician and composer (d. 1971)
February 17 – Kurt Schindler, composer (died 1935)
February 28 – Geraldine Farrar, operatic soprano (d. 1967)
March 5 – Pauline Donalda, operatic soprano (d. 1970)
March 18 – Gian Francesco Malipiero, composer and musicologist (d. 1973)
March 24 – Gino Marinuzzi, conductor and composer (d. 1945)
April 4 – Mary Howe, composer and pianist (d. 1964)
April 17 – Artur Schnabel, pianist (d. 1951)
April 18 – Leopold Stokowski, conductor (d. 1977)
April 23 – Albert Coates, conductor and composer (d. 1953)
April 24 – Albert Valsien, conductor and composer (d. 1955)
May 6 – Georgi Atanasov, composer (d. 1931)
May 11 – Joseph Marx, composer and critic (d. 1964)
May 12 – Kyrylo Stetsenko, conductor, composer, critic and teacher (d. 1922)
June 4 – Erwin Lendvai, composer and choral conductor (d. 1949)
June 17 – Igor Stravinsky, composer (d. 1971)
July 8 – Percy Grainger, composer (d. 1961)
July 28 – Pavel Lamm, musicologist (d. 1951)
August 13 – Georges Jean-Aubry, lyricist (died 1950)
August 15 – Marion Bauer, composer (d. 1955)
August 18 – Marcel Samuel-Rousseau, composer, organist and opera director (d. 1955)
September 6 – John Powell, composer, pianist and ethnomusicologist (d. 1963)
October 6 – Karol Szymanowski, pianist and composer (d. 1937)
November 3 – G. H. Elliott, blackface music hall singer (d. 1962)
November 10 – Rudi Gfaller, Austrian operetta singer and composer (d. 1972)
December 8 – Manuel María Ponce, composer and music teacher (d. 1948)
December 9 – Joaquín Turina, composer (d. 1949)
December 16 – Zoltán Kodály, composer (d. 1967)

Deaths
February 3 – Guglielmo Quarenghi, composer (b. 1826)
February 12 – Madame Céleste, dancer (b. 1815)
February 16 – Julián Arcas, guitarist and composer (b. 1832)
February 20 – Louis Adolphe le Doulcet, comte de Pontécoulant, soldier and musicologist (b. 1794)
February 22 – Harriett Everard, singer and actress (b. 1844)
February 27 – Alfred Jaëll, pianist (b. 1832)
March 1 – Theodor Kullak, pianist and composer (b. 1818)
March 16 – Mariia Surovshchikova-Petipa, ballerina (b. 1836)
April 3 – Friedrich Wilhelm Kücken, composer and conductor (b. 1810)
June 24 (or 25) – Joachim Raff, composer (b. 1822)
June 28 – James Turle, organist and composer (b. 1802)
July – John Zundel, organist, composer and arranger (b. 1815)
July 4 – Joseph Brackett, songwriter (b. 1797)
July 12 – Alfred Pease, composer and pianist (b. 1838)
September 16 – Theodore Eisfeld, conductor (b. 1816)
October 3 – Adelaide Phillips, contralto singer (b. 1833)
October 22 – Oskar Ahnfelt, composer of hymn-tunes (b. 1813)
October 27 – Adolphe Gutmann, composer (b. 1819)
October 29 – Gustav Nottebohm, composer and music editor (b. 1817)
November 2 – Cenobio Paniagua, composer (b. 1821)
November 18 – Aleksander Mirecki, marischal and violinist (b. 1809)
November 20 – Kéler Béla, composer and conductor (b. 1820)
December 29 – Josabeth Sjöberg, painter and music teacher (b. 1812)
date unknown
Edward Mack, composer (b. 1826)
Konstantin Vilboa, composer (b. 1817)

 
1880s in music
19th century in music
Music by year